The 2016 African Nations Championship Final was a football match to determine the winners of the CHAN 2016 tournament and took place on 7 February 2016. The match contested by DR Congo
and Mali
at the Amahoro Stadium in Kigali. DR Congo won the match 3–0, winning the title for the second time. DR Congo became the first nation to win the trophy twice, having won the inaugural CHAN tournament.

Background
DR Congo appeared in their 3rd tournament, and their 2nd final.
There previous best performance in the tournament was reaching the finals in 2009 and won that tournament. Mail was also making its 3rd appears  in the tournament and their best performance in the tournament was in 2014 reaching the quarter-finals. DR Congo beat the host nation Rwanda 1–2 (a.e.t.) in the quarter-finals and beat Guinea 5–4 on Penalties after a 1–1 in regulation time in the semi-finals. Mail beat Tunisia 2–1 in the quarter-finals and beat Ivory Coast 1–0 in the Semi-finals.

Route to the final

Match

Summary

Details

See also
 2016 African Nations Championship

References

External links 

Orange African Nations Championship, Rwanda 2016, CAFonline.com

2016
Final
Mali national football team matches
Democratic Republic of the Congo national football team matches
February 2016 sports events in Africa